Lubombo Conservancy comprises 5 reserves in Eswatini:

 Hlane Royal National Park
 Mbuluzi Game Reserve 
 Mlawula Nature Reserve 
 Shewula Community Nature Reserve
 Nkhalashane Siza Ranch

These areas, comprising about 60,000 hectares, include statutorily proclaimed protected areas, private property, and Swazi nation land.

External links

http://www.thekingdomofswaziland.com/pages/attractions/the_attraction.asp?AttractionsID=42

http://www.sntc.org.sz/programs/lubombo.asp

Protected areas of Eswatini